The Venetian regional election of 1990 took place on 6 and 7 May 1990.

Events
Christian Democracy was by far the largest party, but it was four seats short of an outright majority in the Regional Council. The Greens and the regionalist parties did surprisingly well.

After the election Christian Democrat Franco Cremonese formed a government comprising the Italian Socialist Party, the Italian Republican Party and the Italian Democratic Socialist Party. The government fell in 1992 in the verge of Tangentopoli scandals and was replaced by a succession of governments, which included both Venetian League and the Democratic Party of the Left, the successor party of the Communists.

Results

Source: Regional Council of Veneto

References

Elections in Veneto
1990 elections in Italy